Soulbook is the 25th studio album by Rod Stewart. Like his previous five albums, Soulbook features Stewart singing old material; for this album he sings classic material from Motown and the soul genre. It was released on 17 October 2009 and was produced by Steve Tyrell, Steven Jordan and Chuck Kentis.

The album became Stewart's sixth consecutive album to debut in the Top 5 on the U.S. Billboard 200, peaking at #4. It also found success in Canada and the UK, making it to #3 on the Canadian Albums Chart and #9 on the UK Albums Chart. Furthermore, the album featured at #41 on the Canadian Albums Year-End Chart of 2010.

Track listing

Notes
  signifies Jennifer Hudson vocal producer

Personnel 
Musicians

 Rod Stewart – lead vocals, backing vocals (9)
 Michael Bearden – keyboards (1), Fender Rhodes (2), acoustic piano (4, 11)
 Greg Phillinganes – acoustic piano (2, 14), keyboards (5, 12, 13), backing vocals (5), arrangements (5, 12, 13, 14), synthesizers (14)
 Bob Mann – keyboards (3, 15), guitars (3, 7, 15), arrangements (3, 7, 15), mandolin (5)
 David Paich – keyboards (6, 8, 10)
 Henry Hey – acoustic piano (7, 15)
 Chuck Kentis – keyboards (9)
 Charles Hodges – organ (11)
 Ray Parker Jr. – guitars (1, 2, 4, 6, 8-11)
 Dean Parks – guitars (1, 2, 4, 6, 8, 10, 11)
 Paul Jackson Jr. – guitars (3, 5, 12–15)
 Michael Landau – guitars (5, 13, 15)
 Don Kirkpatrick – guitars (9)
 Paul Warren – guitars (9)
 Bob Babbitt – bass (1, 2, 4, 8, 10)
 Reggie McBride – bass (3, 5, 13, 14)
 Darryl Jones – bass (6, 11)
 Leland Sklar – bass (7)
 Conrad Korsch – bass (9)
 Nathan East – bass (12, 15)
 Steve Jordan – drums (1, 2, 4, 6, 8-11), percussion (1, 2, 4, 6, 8-11), backing vocals (9)
 Ricky Lawson – drums (3, 5, 12–15)
 Russ Kunkel – drums (7)
 David Palmer – drums (9)
 Milt Chocolate – vibraphone (2)
 Clayton Cameron – vibraphone (4)
 Lenny Castro – congas (5)
 Tom Scott – baritone saxophone (1), saxophone (8, 9, 10), alto sax solo (9)
 Lou Marini – saxophone (9)
 James Spake – tenor saxophone (11)
 George Bohanon – trombone (8, 10)
 Larry Farrell – trombone (9)
 Jack Hale – trombone (11)
 Nick Lane – trombone (15)
 Chuck Findley – trumpet (8, 10)
 Wayne Jackson – trumpet (11)
 Matt Fronke – trumpet (15)
 Gayle Levant – harp (6)
 Jeff Driskill – flute (13)
 John Yoakum – oboe (13)
 Brian O'Connor – French horn (14)
 The Los Angeles Strings – strings (1, 2, 6, 8)
 Strings (3, 5, 7, 12): Cello – Matt Cooker, Tim Loo, Miguel Martinez and Giovanna Moraga-Clayton; Violin – Brian Benning, Charlie Bisharat, Mark Cargill, Susan Chatman, Nicole Garcia, Neel Hammond, Gina Kronstadt, Joel Pargman, Kathleen Robertson, John Wittenburg and Shari Zippert
 The New Memphis Strings – strings (4)
 Howard Drossin – string arrangements (1, 2, 6, 8)
 Willie Mitchell – string arrangements (4), horn arrangements (11)
 Lester Snell – orchestration (4), music copyist (4)
 David Low – string contractor (1, 2, 6, 8)
 JoAnn Tominaga – string contractor (3, 5, 7, 12)
 Bruce Dukov – concertmaster (1, 2, 6, 8)
 Charlie Bisharat – concertmaster (3, 5, 7, 12)
 Steve Juliani – music copyist (1, 2, 6, 8)
 Jonathan Kirkscey – string session leader (4) 
 Bridget Anne Cady – backing vocals (1-4, 7-11, 14, 15)
 Di Reed – backing vocals (1-4, 7-11, 14, 15)
 Dorian Holley – harmony vocals (2), backing vocals (5)
 Stevie Wonder – lead vocals (2)
 Judith Hill – backing vocals (3, 12)
 Natasha Pearce – backing vocals (3, 7-10, 14, 15)
 Darryl Tookes – backing vocals (3, 5, 7, 12–15)
 Will Wheaton – backing vocals (3, 5, 12, 13)
 Mary J. Blige – lead vocals (3)
 Smokey Robinson – lead vocals (5)
 Lynn Fiddmont – backing vocals (5)
 Pam Trotter – backing vocals (5)
 Lisa Vaughn – backing vocals (5, 13)
 Jennifer Hudson – lead vocals (6)
 Steve Tyrell – backing vocals (9)

Production 

 Album Producers – Steve Jordan (Tracks 1, 2, 4, 6 & 8-11); Steve Tyrell (Tracks 3, 5, 7, 9 & 12–15); Chuck Kentis (Track 9). 
 Vocals produced by Steve Tyrell; Jennifer Hudson vocals on Track 6 produced by Harvey Mason Jr.
 A&R – Keith Naftaly
 Production Coordinator – JoAnn Tominaga 
 Track Recording – Niko Bolas (Tracks 1, 2, 4, 9 & 11); Jon Allen (Tracks 3, 5, 7, 12 & 13); Al Schmitt (Tracks 6, 8 & 10); Chuck Kentis (Track 9); Bill Schnee (Tracks 14 & 15).
 BGV Recording – Steve Genewick (Tracks 1 & 11); Paul Smith (Tracks 8 & 10); Jon Allen (Tracks 14 & 15).
 Jennifer Hudson vocal recording on Track 6 – Andrew Hey
 Horns Recording – Niko Bolas (Tracks 1, 8, 9 & 10); Lawrence "Boo" Mitchell (Tracks 4 & 11); Jon Allen (Track 15). 
 Strings Recording – Al Schmitt (Tracks 1, 2, 6 & 8); Bill Schnee (Tracks 3, 5, 7 & 12); Lawrence "Boo" Mitchell (Track 4).
 Additional Engineers – Darwin Best, Kenny Moran and Ryan Petrie.
 Assistant string recording on Tracks 3, 5, 7 & 12 – Charlie Bybee
 Mixing – Niko Bolas (Tracks 1, 4, 8, 9 & 10); Bill Schnee (Tracks 2, 3, 5, 7 & 12–15); Al Schmitt (Tracks 6 & 11).
 Additional Pro Tools Editing – Martin Pradler
 Mastered by Greg Calbi at Sterling Sound (New York, NY).
 Drum Technicians for Steve Jordan – Ross Garfield, Chris Gott and Paul Jamieson. 
 Project Manager – Loftus Donovan
 Art Direction and Design – Josh Cheuse
 Photography – Mark Seliger
 Management – Arnold Stiefel for Stiefel Management.
 Sleeve Notes – Rod Stewart

Charts

Weekly charts

Year-end charts

Certifications

References

External links

2009 albums
J Records albums
Rod Stewart albums
Motown cover albums
Albums recorded at Capitol Studios